Steve Linde (born April 23, 1960) is a former editor-in-chief of The Jerusalem Post (2011-2016), and since 2017 serves as editor-in-chief of The Jerusalem Report.

Biography
Linde was born in Harare, Zimbabwe, to Jewish parents, Roseve (Saacks) and Hilyer Samuel Linde, and grew up in Durban, South Africa. At the age of 15, he attended  a four-month "ulpan" study program at Jerusalem’s Kiryat Moriah with other South African Jewish students, which he said "cemented my love of Israel forever." He matriculated in 1977 from Carmel College in Durban, where he was head boy and earned an honors blazer with colors in academics, athletics, rugby and debating. After a one-year program at the Hebrew University of Jerusalem's Rothberg International School, he received a bachelor's degree in Journalism and Media Studies from Rhodes University, where he won a scholarship from the Daily Dispatch newspaper. He went on to earn graduate degrees in sociology from the University of Kwazulu-Natal in Durban and journalism from the University of California at Berkeley. He wrote his sociology thesis on the emergence of Mohandas Gandhi as a charismatic leader in South Africa (under the supervision of Fatima Meer), and his journalism thesis on the homeless in Berkeley (under the supervision of Ben Bagdikian).

Linde immigrated to Israel in 1988 and served in the IDF Artillery Corps. He was a popular radio broadcaster for 21 years (1990-2011), working as an editor, reporter, news reader and for five years as director of English News at Kol Yisrael (Israel Radio). He started working at The Jerusalem Post in 1997, doing stints as night editor, news editor, managing editor and editor-in-chief. Under his five-year editorship, the newspaper boosted its international stature, launching annual conferences in New York for its American readership and in Israel for the foreign diplomatic corps. At the Jerusalem Post Diplomatic Conference in 2013, which Linde called the highlight of his career, he interviewed Israel's ninth president Shimon Peres on stage at the Daniel Herzliya. At the Fifth Annual Jerusalem Post Conference in New York on May 22, 2016, when he handed over to his successor, Yaakov Katz, Linde interviewed actor Michael Douglas and media personality Dr. Ruth Westheimer. He has served as a judge for the Israeli schools' Debating Matters Competition, the Harry Hurwitz Public Speaking Competition, Alon High School's Isaac Ochberg Creative Writing Project, and the Bonei Zion Prize.

References

1960 births
Living people
The Jerusalem Post editors